Cymindis cribrata is a species of ground beetle in the subfamily Harpalinae. It was described by Maximilien Chaudoir in 1875.

References

cribrata
Beetles described in 1875